Phoenix FC was an American professional soccer team based in Phoenix. The team was a member of the USL Professional Division, the third tier of the American Soccer Pyramid. The team's colors were red and white.

History
On June 18, 2012, BDR Sports LLC was incorporated in the State of Arizona to bring a professional soccer team to Phoenix. On July 2, 2012, the USL Pro awarded a franchise to the BDR group for the 2013 season. On July 15, the team announced they had hired David Robertson, Director of Boy's Coaching at Sereno Soccer Club, as head coach. He is a former Rangers, Aberdeen and Leeds United player. He also managed Elgin City and Montrose in the Scottish Third Division. The team name ("Phoenix City FC") and colors were announced the same day. On August 28, the team selected Umbro as the team's official football uniform and equipment supplier. On September 7, the team renamed itself "Phoenix FC", introduced its logo and selected "Wolves" as their nickname.

On September 27, 2012, former Aberdeen striker Darren Mackie signed a one-year contract with Phoenix FC, becoming their first player signing.

On December 11, 2012, Phoenix FC and Arizona State University announced a stadium agreement for 2013. Phoenix FC would play home games at Sun Devil Soccer Stadium beginning in April 2013. As part of the deal, the seating capacity was meant to be expanded by more than 4,000 additional seats, taking the total capacity to over 5,000 seats. However, due to the position of stadium lights poles on the east side of the stadium, the capacity was revised to just over 3,400.

2013 season

Phoenix FC opened their only season with a 2–0 loss to the Los Angeles Blues on March 23, 2013. They won their home opener at Sun Devil Soccer Stadium on March 30, 2013. They defeated VSI Tampa Bay FC 1–0 on a goal by Netinho before a sold-out, standing room crowd of 4,198.

The team finished the 2013 season with 5 wins, 14 losses and 7 ties. Donny Toia lead the team in scoring with six goals and was a nominee for USL Pro Rookie of the Year.

Demise
USL Pro revoked the Phoenix franchise rights from BDR Sports LLC on November 1, 2013, citing multiple violations of the franchise agreement, such as failing to pay its players on time and submitting misleading and inaccurate financial statements. On December 16, 2013, USL Pro awarded the franchise rights for Phoenix FC to American Soccer Marketing LLC, owned by former interim Team President Tim Donald.  On March 12, 2014, American Soccer Marketing announced that it could not continue operating the team in the USL Pro league. They were replaced with Arizona United SC (now Phoenix Rising FC) the next day.

Year-by-year

Players

Roster

Front Office
  Tim Donald – President
  Eric Cornwall – Chairman
  Rui Filipe Bento – General Manager
  Shawn Dietrich – Director of Operations
  David Robertson – Head Coach

Stadiums
Sun Devil Soccer Stadium (2013 – 9 games)
GCU Soccer Stadium (2013 – 1 game)
Reach 11 Soccer Complex (2013 – 3 games)

References

2012 establishments in Arizona
Association football clubs established in 2012
Association football clubs disestablished in 2014
Defunct soccer clubs in Arizona
Soccer clubs in Arizona
Sports in Phoenix, Arizona
Former USL Championship teams
2014 disestablishments in Arizona
Defunct sports teams in Arizona